The men's 'Hard Styles with Weapons' category involved seven contestants from five countries across two continents - Europe and North America.  Each contestant went through seven performances (2 minutes each) with the totals added up at the end of the event.  The gold medallist was Russian Andrey Savushkin who claimed his second individual gold medal in musical forms.  Three fighters claimed silver medals - with American Robert Andreozzi, Brit Daniel Stirling and Russian Andrey Bosak.  The bronze medal went to Germany's Michael Moeller.

Results

See also
List of WAKO Amateur World Championships
List of WAKO Amateur European Championships
List of male kickboxers

References

External links
 WAKO World Association of Kickboxing  Organizations Official Site

Kickboxing events at the WAKO World Championships 2007  Coimbra
2007 in kickboxing
Kickboxing in Portugal